Ollie Lee "Downtown" Brown (February 11, 1944 – April 16, 2015), was an American former professional baseball outfielder, who played in Major League Baseball (MLB), from  to .

After signing with the Giants, prior to the  season, Brown split time as a starting pitcher and outfielder in Minor League Baseball (MiLB). He pitched a no-hitter on August 13, 1963, an 8-0 shutout, while playing for the Class A Decatur Commodores, San Francisco’s farm team, in the Midwest League.

In , Brown was named Most Valuable Player (MVP) of the California League while playing for the Fresno Giants (the league champions that year, with an 86-53 record). That summer, he became a top prospect, hitting 40 home runs (HR), with 133 runs batted in (RBI), while posting a batting average (BA) of .329, and amassing a 1.083 on-base plus slugging (OPS) Sabermetric score.

Brown was involved in a nine-player transaction when he was sent along with Ellie Rodríguez, Joe Lahoud, Skip Lockwood and Gary Ryerson from the Milwaukee Brewers to the California Angels for Steve Barber, Clyde Wright, Ken Berry, Art Kusnyer and cash on October 23, 1973.

Brown was best known for his defensive skills, particularly the strength of his throwing arm. Before games, he entertained fans by throwing the baseball from the far right field corner to third base on the fly.

In 1221 games over 13 seasons, Brown posted a .265 batting average (964-for-3642) with 404 runs, 102 home runs, 454 RBI, 30 stolen bases, .324 on-base percentage and .394 slugging percentage. He recorded a .977 fielding percentage playing at all three outfield positions.

His older brother, Willie Brown, was a star football running back at the University of Southern California (USC) who went on to play with the Los Angeles Rams and Philadelphia Eagles of the National Football League (NFL). His younger brother, Oscar Brown, was an outfielder with the Atlanta Braves.

Brown died due to the effects of mesothelioma at the age of 71 on April 16, 2015, at his home in Buena Park.

References

External links

Ollie Brown at SABR (Baseball BioProject)
Ollie Brown at Astros Daily

1944 births
2015 deaths
African-American baseball players
Deaths from mesothelioma
Deaths from cancer in California
Major League Baseball right fielders
Baseball players from Alabama
San Francisco Giants players
San Diego Padres players
Oakland Athletics players
Milwaukee Brewers players
Houston Astros players
Philadelphia Phillies players
Sportspeople from Tuscaloosa, Alabama
People from Buena Park, California
20th-century African-American sportspeople
21st-century African-American people
Long Beach Polytechnic High School alumni
Arizona Instructional League Giants players
Decatur Commodores players
Fresno Giants players
Phoenix Giants players
Salem Rebels players
Tacoma Giants players